Opalescence or the play of color is the optical phenomena displayed by the mineraloid gemstone opal (hydrated silicon dioxide). However, there are three notable types of opal (precious, common, and fire), each with different optical effects, therefore the intended meaning varies depending on context:

 Precious opal: The general definition of opalescence is a milky iridescence displayed by an opal which describes the visual effect of precious opal very well, and opalescence is commonly used in lay terms as a synonym for iridescence.

 Common opal: In contrast, common opal does not display an iridescence but often exhibits a hazy sheen of light from within the stone—the phenomenon that gemologists define strictly as opalescence. This milky sheen displayed by opal is a form of adularescence.

 Fire opal: a relatively transparent gemstone with a vivid yellow-orange-red color and rarely displays iridescence.

The optical effects seen in various types of opal are a result of refraction (precious and fire) or reflection (common) due to the layering, spacing, and size of the myriad microscopic silicon dioxide spheres and included water (or air) in its physical structure. When the size and spacing of the silica spheres are relatively small, refracted blue-green colors are prevalent; when relatively larger, refracted yellow-orange-red colors are seen; and when larger yet, reflection yields a milky-hazy sheen.

In a physical sense, some cases of opalescence could be related to a type of dichroism seen in highly dispersed systems with little opacity. Due to Rayleigh scattering, a transparent material appears yellowish-red in transmitted white light and blue in the scattered light perpendicular to the transmitted light. The phenomenon illustrated in the bottom photo is an example of the Tyndall effect.

See also 
Aventurescence
Labradorescence
Moonstone (gemstone)

References

Optical phenomena